Inuyasha is a role-playing game for PlayStation, developed and published by Bandai, which was released in Japan in 2001. The game is based on the events of the Inuyasha manga and anime. In this game you work your way through various missions and stories that take place throughout the series.

Premise
Playing as the characters from the series, you begin from the time Kagome falls through the well and meets her half-demon companion, and the story of Inuyasha unfolds from there. Inuyasha and Kagome build their relationship with each other, and along the way meet the familiar faces of Shippo, Miroku, Sango, and resurrected Kikyo, and face off against enemies like Sesshoumaru and Naraku.

Some cutscenes are not from the anime series.

2001 video games
PlayStation (console) games
PlayStation (console)-only games
Role-playing video games
Japan-exclusive video games
Inuyasha games
Bandai games
Video games developed in Japan